The Swedish Defence Conscription and Assessment Agency ( or ), previously the Swedish Defence Recruitment Agency, is a  Government agency in Sweden which conducts recruitment for national service.

External links
 

Defence agencies of Sweden
National Service Administration